Douglas Horace Clemens (born June 9, 1939), is an American former professional baseball outfielder, who played in Major League Baseball (MLB) from – for the Chicago Cubs, Philadelphia Phillies and St. Louis Cardinals. He batted left-handed and threw right-handed.

Early life
Born in Leesport, Berks County, Pennsylvania, in 1939, Clemens attended Muhlenberg High School, lettering in both football and baseball, while under the tutelage of his own father, Head Coach Lloyd “Scoop” Clemens (himself, a Phillies scout). A highly-recruited halfback, he (young Clemens) played collegiately in Jim Brown’s footsteps, at Syracuse University. Following his Junior year, Clemens turned pro, signing with the Cardinals.

Baseball career
A pinch-hitting specialist for most of his MLB career, Clemens’ main claim to fame stems from the June 15, 1964, trade that brought future Hall of Famer Lou Brock to the Cardinals.

That spring, Clemens broke camp with the Cards. In early-season action, he tallied 33 games played, while hitting .205, with six walks, and 16 strikeouts. On June 15, the Cardinals traded Clemens, Bobby Shantz, and Ernie Broglio to the Chicago Cubs, in exchange for Jack Spring, Paul Toth, and (although not-yet-evident) Cooperstown-bound outfielder Brock.

Clemens continued in platoon and pinch-hitting roles until retiring as a Phillie, following a 1968 season, most of which was spent with their Triple-A San Diego Padres (PCL) club.

During his nine-year MLB career, including the full seasons of  through , Clemens collected 211 hits, with 34 doubles seven triples, and 12 home runs. He batted .229 and was credited with 88 runs batted in (RBI).

References

External links

Doug Clemens at SABR (Baseball BioProject)
Doug Clemens at Baseball Almanac
Doug Clemens at Baseball Library
Doug Clemens at Baseball Gauge

1939 births
Living people
Atlanta Crackers players
Baseball players from Pennsylvania
Billings Mustangs players
Charleston Marlins players
Chicago Cubs players
Major League Baseball outfielders
People from Berks County, Pennsylvania
Philadelphia Phillies players
St. Louis Cardinals players
San Diego Padres (minor league) players
San Juan Marlins players
Syracuse Orange football players
Syracuse Orangemen baseball players
Tulsa Oilers (baseball) players